Anett Kontaveit was the defending champion, however she chose not to participate.

Georgina García Pérez won the title after defeating Arantxa Rus 6–2, 6–0 in the final.

Seeds

Draw

Finals

Top half

Bottom half

References
Main Draw

Engie Open Andrézieux-Bouthéon 42 - Singles